The Samsung SGH-D900, also known as the Ultra Edition 12.9 or Black Carbon, is a slider-style mobile phone created by Samsung Electronics that was announced in Q3 2006 as part of the Samsung Ultra Edition line. It is marketed as the world's thinnest slider phone. Since the end of 2006, a Wine Red edition was added and 2007 marked the introduction of a chrome edition to the lineup. There is also an upgrade of this model, the Samsung D900i which can be used to access documents on your computer from your phone and added an FM radio as well as was made out of higher-quality materials.

The D900 was succeeded by Z720, also known as Ultra Edition 13.8 in August 2006, following the 3MP camera, QVGA display, upgraded interface and high-speed HSDPA/3G connectivity and it was available exclusively for Vodafone, Movistar (Spain only) & China Mobile (Z728 only). Vodafone also sold the exclusive McLaren Special Edition units along with Sharp GX29 and 770SH.

Features
The phone has features including:
 Quad-band capabilities, allowing it to be used as a mobile phone on all major GSM networks across the globe
 Built in hands-free function
 Built in Bluetooth wireless technology
 Custom animated backgrounds (varies with country of sale)
 Memory card slot for optional MicroSD memory card up to 2GB ( 2 GB only with the latest firmware)
 60 MB internal memory
 MP3 Ringtones
 Speakerphone
 Digital audio player with MP3, WMA and AAC/AAC+ playback
 3.15 Megapixel digital camera with many shooting modes and an integrated LED photo/video light (flash), autofocus, and the ability to perform basic image editing functions
 MPEG-4, 3gp video recording CIF 352x288 @ 30fps/playback
 Java games
 Alarm clock with three configurable alarms
 Calendar
 Calculator
 FM Radio (D900i only)
The slider can be configured to accept and close calls, as well as locking and unlocking the keypad. Settings are available which allow for the phone to stay unlocked even when closed.

However, the Samsung SGH-D900 also lacks some basic physical features common to most cellphones. For one, there is no standard carrying case or belt clip, nor are there any compatible belt clips, so the only way to fix it to a belt is to purchase a generic belt holder that has the same dimensions as the phone. Also, there is no protrusion upon which to tie a cellphone strap. This means that people who enjoy personalizing their cellphones with charms, pendants, and other personal straps will not have this choice.

The SGH-D900 suffers from a number of software quirks. The Java implementation does not allow applications to access the network without repeatedly asking the user for permission - there is no "always allow" option. The handset also lacks the ability to use imported files as an SMS alert tone, leaving only the small default selection of sounds available to the user. The camera features also have a number of quirks, such as the shutter sound preceding the actual image capture by approximately half a second (leading to blurred and poorly aimed images as the user moves the phone after the expected exposure duration has passed.) In addition the camera does not take a photo if you hold down the camera button - the user must press and release quickly. Photos cannot be saved directly to the memory card, and moving the photos already taken leads to duplicate file names. Also, only images in "My Photos" folder can be zoomed, so any imported images must be moved to that folder before they can be zoomed.

For the SGH-D900i, Samsung removed Picsel Document Viewer in favor of the FM radio function.

Performance 

The D900 comes with a 3.15 megapixel camera (2048x1536 pixels). Video capabilities are higher than the usual standards and recording is made in CIF (352x288 pixels) resolution. The internal memory and optional MicroSD card slot makes it ideal for listening to music on the go. A loud speakerphone and voice clarity filtration software makes for easy use in noisy locations. The battery life is decent for such a compact cellphone, and can last for few days on standby or approximately 5 to 6 hours of conversation. The slider is easy to operate, with a protrusion for the thumb that allows it to be easily extended or retracted. The interface inside it does not allow the users to modify the phone's profiles or add applications, compared to its rivals where you can upgrade the firmware through USB.

Gallery of Photos

Notes and references

External links
 Manufacturer's FAQs
 Manufacturer's Users Guide (PDF)
 Manufacturer's Menu Tree
 Samsung D900 Interactive Site with 3D Views
 Samsung D900 Site
 Mobile-Review.com Review
 CrunchGear.com Video Review
 Samsung D900 review: Slim slider extreme - GSMArena.com

D900
Mobile phones introduced in 2006
Slider phones